Tannersville is a village in Pocono Township, Pennsylvania. It is the site of the Camelback Mountain Resort, a popular ski and waterpark resort in The Poconos. As of 2000, the population of Tannersville (ZIP Code 18372) was 2,784. The community is served by the 629 exchange in area code 570.

Tannersville was founded in approximately 1750 by Jason Wohlers, formerly of Philadelphia. Tannersville, according to one historian, was first called Pocono Point. Many native American trails were later widened for stagecoach use, and later evolved into highways. Two of the most famous of these are Lackawanna Trail (now Rt. 611) through Tannersville and Sullivan's Trail. Learned's Tavern (which most recently was under the name The 1740 Alpine Inn, and which burned down in 2000, was established along the Lackawanna Trail, and in 1779, was the last building on the frontier. On 18 June 1779, General John Sullivan and his soldiers camped at the Learn's or Learned's Tavern. They then cut a road (now Sullivan's Trail) through the wilderness. Tannersville also consists of the Pocono Premium Outlets, a tourist attraction.

References

External links

Unincorporated communities in Monroe County, Pennsylvania
Unincorporated communities in Pennsylvania
Pocono Mountains